The 1966–67 Soviet Cup was the ninth edition of the Soviet Cup ice hockey tournament. 35 teams participated in the tournament, which was won by CSKA Moscow for the sixth consecutive season.

Participating teams

Tournament

First round

1/16 finals

1/8 finals

Quarterfinals

Semifinals

Final

External links 
 Tournament on hockeyarchives.info
 Tournament on hockeyarchives.ru

Cup
Soviet Cup (ice hockey) seasons